Joseph Hector "Hec" Lépine (December 7, 1897 — March 29, 1951) was a Canadian professional ice hockey forward who played 33 games in the National Hockey League for the Montreal Canadiens during the 1925–26 season. The rest of his career, which lasted from 1917 to 1927, was spent in minor leagues. He was born in Sainte-Anne-de-Bellevue, Quebec. Hector is the brother of Alfred Lépine.

Career statistics

Regular season and playoffs

External links
 

1897 births
1951 deaths
Canadian ice hockey forwards
Fort Pitt Hornets players
Ice hockey people from Quebec
Montreal Canadiens players
People from Sainte-Anne-de-Bellevue, Quebec
Providence Reds players